Blíževedly is a municipality and village in Česká Lípa District in the Liberec Region of the Czech Republic. It has about 600 inhabitants.

Administrative parts
Villages of Hvězda, Litice and Skalka are administrative parts of Blíževedly.

References

Villages in Česká Lípa District